Endless Dream may refer to:

Albums 
 Endless Dream, a 1992 album by Vivian Chow
 Endless Dream, a 1988 album by BZN
Endless Dream, a 2010 album by Shizuka
 Endless Dream, a 2020 album by Peter Bjorn and John

Songs 
 "Endless Dream", a song by God Is an Astronaut, from the album A Moment of Stillness
 "Endless Dream", a song by Yes, from the album Talk